Arch is a masculine given name and a surname, usually a shortened form of Archibald.

People with the surname 
 E. L. Arch, a pen name of American novelist Rachel Cosgrove Payes (1922–1998)
 Hannes Arch (1967–2016), Austrian air racer and 2008 world champion
 John Arch (born 1959), American progressive metal singer born John Maurice Archambault
 John Arch (born 1964), American politician
 Joseph Arch (1826–1919), English politician

People with the given name 
 Arch Bevis (born 1955), Australian politician
 Arch Bobbitt (1895–1978), American judge
 Arch Corbett (1883–1920), Australian rules footballer
 Arch Crippin (1916–2008), Australian rugby league footballer
 Arch Dale (1882–1962), Scottish editorial cartoonist who sometimes signed his work as "Arch"
 Arch Deal (1931–2020), American newscaster
 Arch Freeman (c. 1890–1918), American aviator
 J. Arch Getty (born 1950), American historian
 Arch Hall Sr. (1908–1978), American actor, film director, and screenwriter 
 Arch Hall Jr. (born 1943), American actor, musician, aviator, and writer
 Arch Higgins, American ballet dancer
 Arch Jelley (born 1922), New Zealand athletics coach
 Arch Johnson (1922–1997), American actor
 Arch Knott (1916–1998), Australian rules footballer
 Arch MacDonald (1911–1985), American broadcast journalist and television pioneer
 Arch L. Madsen (1913–1997), American broadcast executive
 Arch Manning, American football quarterback
 Arch Martin (1931–2009), American jazz trombonist
 Arch McDonald (1901–1960), American sports announcer
 Arch McDonald (footballer) (1882–1932), Australian rules footballer
 Arch W. McFarlane (1885–1960), American businessman and politician
 Arch McKirdy (1924–2013), Australian radio presenter and broadcasting executive
 Arch Merrill (1894–1974), American journalist and author
 Arch A. Moore Jr. (1923–2015), American lawyer, politician and convicted felon
 Arch Muirhead (1876–1958), Australian rules footballer
 Arch Nicholson (1941–1990), Australian film director
 Arch Oboler (1909–1987), American playwright, screenwriter, novelist, producer and director
 Arch Pafford, Canadian politician
 Arch Presby (1907–2007), Canadian-American radio and television announcer
 Arch Reilly (1891–1963), American baseball player
 Arch Wilkinson Shaw (1876–1962), American publisher and business theorist
 Arch B. Swank Jr. (1913–1999), American architect
 Arch Thompson, Australian rugby league footballer
 Arch Ward (1896–1955), sports editor for the Chicago Tribune newspaper
 Arch West (1914–2011), American marketing executive
 Arch Colson Whitehead (born 1960), American novelist
 Arch Whitehouse (1895–1979), British aviator and author
 Arch Whiting (1936–2007), American actor
 Arch Wilder (1917–2002), Canadian ice hockey player
 Arch G. Woodside (born 1943), American marketing consultant and author

See also
 J. Arch Getty (born 1950), American historian and professor
 Archie

Masculine given names
English-language surnames
Hypocorisms